Ainslee may refer to:

 Mary Ainslee (1919–1991), American film actress
 Ainslee Cox (1936–1988), American music conductor
 Ainslee Lamb, Canadian field hockey coach
 Ainslee's Magazine, American literary periodical published from 1897 to December 1926

See also
 Ainslie (disambiguation)
 Ansley